Matthew David Edwards (born 15 June 1971) is an English former professional footballer who played as a winger. He made 68 Football League appearances playing for Reading and Brighton & Hove Albion. He was on the books of Tottenham Hotspur without playing first-team football, appeared once for Peterborough United in the Associate Members' Cup, and played non-league football for clubs including Kettering Town, where he missed the whole 1994–95 Football Conference season through injury, Walton & Hersham (initially on loan), Enfield, Carshalton Athletic, Sutton United, Molesey, Yeading, Bognor Regis Town and Egham Town.

References

1971 births
Living people
Footballers from Hammersmith
English footballers
Association football wingers
Tottenham Hotspur F.C. players
Reading F.C. players
Peterborough United F.C. players
Brighton & Hove Albion F.C. players
Kettering Town F.C. players
Walton & Hersham F.C. players
Enfield F.C. players
Carshalton Athletic F.C. players
Sutton United F.C. players
Molesey F.C. players
Yeading F.C. players
Bognor Regis Town F.C. players
Egham Town F.C. players
English Football League players
National League (English football) players
Isthmian League players